Farm to Market Road 361 (FM 361) is a state highway in Fort Bend County in the U.S. state of Texas. It begins at FM 1994 in Long Point, heads northwest through Fairchilds, and ends at State Highway 36 (SH 36) near Pleak.

Route description
FM 361 is a two-lane highway for its entire length. It begins at FM 1994 at Long Point at a place where electric transmission lines pass overhead.

History
FM 361 was originally designated on June 18, 1945, to run from SH 36 south of Rosenberg to Fairchilds. On March 18, 1947, it was extended from Fairchilds to Long Point.

Major intersections

See also

References

0361
Transportation in Fort Bend County, Texas